Parit Buntar (Jawi: ڤاريت بونتر, Northern Malay: Paghit Buntaq) is a town in Kerian District, Perak, Malaysia. It is bordering to Nibong Tebal in Penang and Bandar Baharu in Kedah.It is also the district capital of Kerian District.

This district is known as the Rice Bowl of Perak due to its large areas of paddy fields. Irrigation system has been built to reclaim the areas and to control the water flow into and out of the paddy fields. A few areas suffer from flooding in some seasons. The economic activity is fishing especially at Sungai Acheh, Bagan Tiang, Tanjung Piandang and Kuala Kurau, and commercial businesses and industrial in the Parit Buntar City Center.

This city has a tropical climate. There is a great deal of rainfall in Parit Buntar, even in the driest month. This location is classified as Af by Köppen and Geiger. The temperature averages .

History 
History of Parit Buntar town name is derived from the name of a leader of Tok Buntar famous people in the past where he and his followers have built trenches of Sungai Kerian to flow into the paddy fields. The ditch was originally known Parit Tok Buntar and now known as Parit Buntar.

The Big Clock (Jam Besar) in the old town was one of the landmarks Parit Buntar. The clock was inaugurated by Tunku Abdul Rahman on August 24, 1961 to commemorate the progress and prosperity of all the people of Parit Buntar. Parit Buntar and Bandar Baharu connected to the bridge that crosses Sungai Kerian.

Transportation 
Parit Buntar are accessible via:

North–South Expressway (Malaysia) (exit Bandar Baharu, Jawi, Penang or Alor Pongsu)

Federal Road (Jalan Ipoh-Butterworth)

KTM ETS

Penang International Airport (about 50 minutes from/to airport)

Rapid Penang

KTM Komuter Northern Sector

Climate 
The least amount of rainfall occurs in February. The variation in temperatures throughout the year is 1.0 °C.

Tragedy 
Behind the serenity of Sungai Kerian was a ferry tragedy that took place in September 1972. It claimed about 20 lives, mostly school children from Bandar Baharu, Kedah who crossed the river using the ferry to attend school in Parit Buntar, Perak. Since this unfortunate incident, the ferry ceased operations and a concrete bridge was built.

See also 
 Parit Buntar railway station
 Universiti Sains Malaysia Engineering Campus

References

External links 
 JPN Parit Buntar
 Majlis Daerah Kerian – Local Authority

Kerian District
Populated places in Perak